Italy competed at the 2015 World Championships in Athletics in Beijing, China, from 22–30 August 2015.

Finalists
Italy national athletics team ranked 29th (with only four finalists) in the IAAF placing table. Rank obtained by assigning eight points in the first place and so on to the eight finalists.

Results
(q – qualified, NM – no mark, SB – season best)

Men
Track and road events

Field events

Women 
Track and road events

Field events

References

External links
ITALY - 15TH IAAF WORLD CHAMPIONSHIPS

Nations at the 2015 World Championships in Athletics
World Championships in Athletics
Italy at the World Championships in Athletics